Metmani Chaudhary (born 3 April 1973) is a Nepali politician who is a Member of Parliament (MP) in the House of Representatives elected from Dang 1 (constituency) since 2018. He is currently serving as the Minister of Urban Development in the ruling coalition led by Prime Minister and Nepali Congress President Sher Bahadur Deuba. Chaudhary is a member of the newly formed CPN (Unified Socialist).

References

Living people
Communist Party of Nepal (Unified Socialist) politicians
Nepal Communist Party (NCP) politicians
Place of birth missing (living people)
People from Dang District, Nepal
21st-century Nepalese people
Nepal MPs 2017–2022
Communist Party of Nepal (Unified Marxist–Leninist) politicians
1973 births
Nepal MPs 2022–present